John Albert Thompson (May 19, 1927 – May 24, 2022) was an American football executive. He served as the first general manager of the Seattle Seahawks from 1976 to 1982.

Early life and education
Thompson was born on May 19, 1927, in Washington, and grew up in South Bend, Washington. In high school, he was valedictorian of his class. Thompson attended the University of Washington, but left before receiving a degree.

Executive career
Thompson later returned to the University of Washington, serving several years as their sports information director. He left after their win in the 1961 Rose Bowl over the Minnesota Golden Gophers.

In , Thompson was named assistant to the president of the National Football Conference (NFC), who at the time was George Halas. After a few months in that position, he moved to the NFL management council in November 1971.

Wellington Mara, a Pro Football Hall of Famer and owner of the New York Giants, said "Seattle could not have made a better choice. He has experienced success at every level of professional football. When my opinion was asked by the Seattle people, he was my only choice." Among the first tasks of Thompson was to pick the name of the team and colors. He decided to hold a fan vote to decide the name. The "Seahawks" had the most votes out of 20,365 entries with 1,741 different names. Thompson later oversaw the hiring of Jack Patera as head coach on January 3, 1976.

In his first season as general manager, the Seahawks compiled a record of 2–12. They went 5–9 in the following year, which was at the time the best record for a expansion team in their second season. The 1978 Seahawks were 9–7, at the time the best record for a third-year expansion franchise. For this, Thompson was named NFL Executive of the Year by Sporting News and Jack Patera was named Coach of the Year.

Later life and death
Thompson was never again a member of an NFL team but did have a stint with the Sports and Events Council of the Greater Seattle Chamber of Commerce before announcing his retirement.

He was an avid fan of the Seattle Seahawks. Thompson died on May 24, 2022, five days after his 95th birthday.

References

1927 births
2022 deaths
People from South Bend, Washington
American football executives
University of Washington alumni
Minnesota Vikings executives
Seattle Seahawks executives
Sportspeople from Washington (state)